Panayiotis Ioannou (born 25 March 1986 in Limassol) is a Cypriot footballer who plays for AEZ Zakakiou.

External links
 

1986 births
Living people
Cypriot footballers
Association football defenders
Apollon Limassol FC players
Aris Limassol FC players
Pafos FC players
AEK Kouklia F.C. players
AEZ Zakakiou players
Cypriot First Division players